Badri Maisuradze (born on November 13, 1966) is a Georgian tenor opera singer, a leading dramatic tenor of the Bolshoi Theatre in Moscow, Russia.

Born in Tbilisi, Georgian SSR, he graduated from the Tbilisi State Conservatoire in 1989, after which he became a probationer at the Bolshoi Theatre. In 1990-1993, he was a soloist at Tbilisi Opera and Ballet Theatre. In 1995, he joined the Bolshoi Theatre.

From 2016 he is leading Georgian National Opera and Ballet Theatre aT Tbilisi. 
In 2018 he founded first international vocal competition in Georgia - “Opera Crown”

References

External links 
 Badri Maisuradze's Official Website

1966 births
21st-century male opera singers from Georgia (country)
Musicians from Tbilisi
Living people
20th-century male opera singers from Georgia (country)